General Sir Basil Oscar Paul Eugster,  (15 August 1914 – 5 April 1984) was a senior British Army officer who served as Commander in Chief, UK Land Forces from 1972 to 1974.

Army career
A British soldier of Swiss descent, Basil Eugster attended Beaumont College. In 1935 he joined the Irish Guards. He served with his regiment through the Second World War and fought in the Narvik Campaign in Norway in 1940. He was Commanding Officer of the 3rd Battalion Irish Guards in 1945, and again in 1947, and of the 1st Battalion Irish Guards from 1951 to 1954.

Eugster served as Commander of 3rd Infantry Brigade in Cyprus from 1959 to 1962 and was then General Officer Commanding 4th Division in Germany from 1963 to 1965. He went on to become Major-General commanding the Household Brigade and General Officer Commanding London District from 1965 to 1968 and Commander of British Forces in Hong Kong from 1968 to 1970. He was then General Officer Commanding Southern Command from 1971 to 1972. He served as the Commander in Chief, UK Land Forces from 1972 to 1974 when he retired. In 1966, Eugster was awarded the Austrian Grand Decoration of Honour in Gold with Star.

Later career
He was Colonel of the Regiment of the Irish Guards until his death in 1984, aged 69.

References

External links
 Photos and medal citations

|-
 

|-

|-
 

|-
 

|-

1914 births
1984 deaths
Knights Commander of the Order of the Bath
Knights Commander of the Royal Victorian Order
Commanders of the Order of the British Empire
Companions of the Distinguished Service Order
Recipients of the Military Cross
Recipients of the Grand Decoration with Star for Services to the Republic of Austria
British people of Swiss descent
Irish Guards officers
British Army personnel of World War II
British Army generals
British military personnel of the 1936–1939 Arab revolt in Palestine
Place of birth missing
Place of death missing